Mueang Tak is the capital district (amphoe mueang) of Tak province, western Thailand.

History
In the Sukhothai era, Mueang Tak was the western frontier city. The old location of the city was in Tambon Ko Taphao, now Ban Tak district. It was moved because its old location was not strategically good. Another old city name was Ra-haeng.

Mueang Tak district was established in 1886. The first district office was together with the Tak province hall. A new office was established beside Phahonyothin highway in 1956. However 1965 it burned down, thus the government rented the house of Luang San Buranurak as a temporary district office. The new office was finished and opened in 1967.

Geography
Neighboring districts are (clockwise from south): Wang Chao, Phop Phra, Mae Sot, Mae Ramat, Ban Tak of Tak Province, Ban Dan Lan Hoi of Sukhothai province, Phran Kratai, Kosamphi Nakhon of Kamphaeng Phet province
  
The important water resource of the district is the Ping River. There are two national parks in the district: Lan Sang National Park and Taksin Maharat National Park (partly in neighboring Mae Sot).

Administration
The district is divided into 14 sub-districts (tambons), which are further subdivided into 102 villages (mubans). The town (thesaban mueang) Tak covers tambons Rahaeng, Nong Luang, Chiang Ngoen, and Hua Diat, the sub-district municipality (thesaban tambon) Mai Ngam the complete same-named tambon. There are a further nine tambon administrative organizations (TAO).

Numbers 10, 16 and 17 belong to the tambon which now form Wang Chao District.

References

External links
amphoe.com (Thai)

Ban Tak